Henry Abbott or Abbot may refer to:

 Henry Abbot (martyr) (died 1597), English layman
 Henry Abbott (Irish judge) (born 1947), former judge of the Irish High Court, 2002–2017; former Irish Fianna Fáil politician and barrister
 Henry Larcom Abbot (1831–1927), American military engineer and civil war general
 Henry Livermore Abbott (1842–1864), American civil war soldier
 Henry William Charles Abbott (1807 or 1812–1859), for whom the Abbott Papyrus is named.
 Henry Abbott (merchant) (1834–1876), British merchant acting as consul for Germany in Tessaloniki, killed in the Salonika Incident

See also
 Henry Abbott Technical High School, Danbury, Connecticut
 Harry Abbott (disambiguation)